Route 354 (highest elevation: 507 ft) is an east-west regional road in Quebec, Canada, starting from Route 159 north of Ste-Anne de la Pérade going to St-Raymond. It follows the Rivière Ste-Anne on the south shore most of the time. It is 55 km long, and overlaps Route 363 about 4 km in St-Casimir. Between St-Casimir and Ste-Anne-de-la-Pérade, it is named the "Rapide Nord", where it is the only part it is on the north shore of the river. It becomes rue Tessier Ouest in the village zone. This section was really bad until fall 2005, when it was newly paved on 12 km. Once it crosses the Rivière Ste-Anne, in the village of St-Casimir, it takes the name of rue (street) Notre-Dame.

From St-Alban to St-Raymond (Chute Panet), the route has the name of "Route du Golf", because there is the "Golf des Pins" in St-Alban. In St-Raymond, it connects to Route 365 and Route 367.

After Chute-Panet, arriving to St-Raymond, the route uses the name of rue (street) St-Pierre. There is no sign saying the 354 ends there, nor is there one saying that it starts there, either.

It goes through another village before Chute Panet: Sainte-Christine-d'Auvergne, a very small place. Right after passing Ste-Christine, there is the "Pont des Cascades", where canoers can start their expedition on the rivière Ste-Anne.

Many deer are visible on this route at night in the summer.

Towns along Route 354

 Saint-Casimir
 Saint-Alban
 Saint-Gilbert
 Sainte-Christine d'Auvergne
 Saint-Raymond-de-Portneuf

Major intersections

See also
 List of Quebec provincial highways

References

External links 
 Provincial Route Map (Courtesy of the Quebec Ministry of Transportation) 
 Route 354 on Google Maps

354
Roads in Capitale-Nationale